Sari Hanafi is currently a professor of sociology at the American University of Beirut and chair of the  Islamic Studies program. He is the president of the International Sociological Association and also the editor of Idafat: the Arab Journal of Sociology (Arabic).  In 2018, Hanafi founded "Athar", the Portal for Social impact of scientific research in/on the Arab world.

Biography 
A Syrian-Palestinian, Hanafi studied engineering and got his BS in civil engineering from Damascus University (1984). Hanafi moved to social sciences later on and studied sociology from the same university where he got a BA in 1987. He then attended University of Strasbourg where he received a master's degree in 1989 under the supervision of Philippe Breton. In 1994, Hanafi finally got a PhD from the Ecole des Hautes Etudes en Sciences Sociales, Paris, where he wrote his thesis entitled Les ingénieurs en Syrie: Modernisation, technobureaucratie et identité.

He was the vice president of the board of the Arab Council of Social Science (2015-2016). He holds a Ph.D. in sociology from the Ecole des Hautes Etudes en Sciences Sociales-Paris (School for Advanced Studies in the Social Sciences) (1994). He has also served as a visiting professor/fellow at the University of Poitiers and Migrintern and the Fondation Maison des Sciences de l'Homme (France), University of Bologna and Ravenna (Italy), Chr. Michelsen Institute (Bergen-Norway), Doha Institute for Graduate Studies.  Hanafi was also a former senior researcher at the Cairo-based French research center, Centre d'études et de documentation économique juridique et sociale (1994-2000). He is the author of numerous journal articles and book chapters on the sociology of religion, sociology of (forced) migration; politics of scientific research; civil society, elite formation and transitional justice. Among his recent books are: Addressing the rupture between the religious and social sciences:

Career 
He has served as a visiting professor at the University of Poitiers and Migrintern, France, University of Bologna and Ravenna, Italy, and a visiting fellow in CMI, Bergen, Norway. Hanafi is also the former director of the Palestinian Refugee and Diaspora Centre (Shaml) from 2000 to 2004, and a former senior research at the Cairo-based French research center, Centre d'études et de documentation économique juridique et sociale (CEDEJ) from 1994 to 2000.

In addition to his academic work, Hanafi has served as a consultant to the UN, the World Bank, and other organizations.

Awards 
 Abdelhamid Shouman Award, 2014
 Kuwait Award for social science, 2015
 Honorary Doctorate (Doctor Honoris Causa) of the National University of San Marcos, 2019

Research Topics 
Hanafi has engaged in a wide range of research activities and conducted in-depth research on different topics, including knowledge production, religious discourse and curriculum, migration. Priorly, he focused largely on refugee camps in the Arab world. His current field of expertise encompasses the domains of political sociology, the sociology of knowledge and the sociology of religion. Predominantly ethnographic in nature, Hanafi's research methodology involves participant observation techniques, qualitative interviews, and focus groups, but also more quantitative such as survey and network analysis. His H-Index in Google Scholar is 29 which is considered very high for sociology and his citations are at 5193 (for all years) and 3357 (since 2014). In addition to these longer pieces above, he has published 21 book review (five of which were published in two languages) and 71 op-eds and interviews, mainly in local and regional newspapers, as well as policy reports in Arabic, English and French.

Knowledge Production in the Arab World 
Hanafi has co-authored book with Rigas Arvanitis, Knowledge Production in the Arab World: The Impossible Promise (2015). The book received six reviews and a published debate in al-Mustaqbal al-Arabi between three scholars in the field of knowledge production: Antoun Zahlan, Adnan al-Amin and Mustafa al-Teer. The book addresses the knowledge production crisis in the Arab world, as well as the problem in the translation of knowledge into public awareness and policy. As a result of the book, Hanafi has encouraged the translation of scholarly works into Arabic, in an attempt to revitalize local and regional deliberation on societal issues. Hanafi has observed that Arab Eastern scholars fall into the trap of publishing globally and perishing locally, or publishing locally and perishing globally, thus highlighting the need to bridge the gap between these two trends.

Political sociology: Camp governmentality 
Hanafi's other research interests encompass political philosophy, political sociology, and the sociology of migration, covering different issues related to the Palestinian refugees and diaspora, and beyond. In these fields, Julie Peteet of Louisville University acknowledged in her 2007 article that Hanafi is the first scholar to conceptualize the Palestinians abroad as a Palestinian diaspora. In the same vein, his conceptualization of the camp as a space of exception has been widely cited in academic and policy works. 
In addition, Hanafi is a research director of the program “Policy and Governance in Palestinian Refugee Camps” at the Issam Fares Institute for Public Policy and International Affairs (IFI), and has facilitated these public and policy aspects. His tasks have been to follow-up the first stage of the research on governance on the refugee camps in Lebanon. This research project aims to clarify the relationship between power, sovereignty and space in Palestinian refugee camps in the Arab East, during 2009–2010. This research project resulted in many publications in English, French and Arabic, including a working paper in Arabic and English. Hanafi also took part in a multi-disciplinary research team on “Poverty assessment and targeting projects for Palestinian refugees living in Lebanon.” The research team is composed of AUB faculty (a sociologist, a nutritionist, a public health specialist, and an economist) and headed by economist Dr. Jad Shaaban.

The Concept of Spaciocide 
In his article “Explaining spacio-cide in the Palestinian territory”, Hanafi declared that his lived experience felt like what he called "spacio-cide". He lived in the West Bank (part of the Occupied Palestinian territories) in the time of the second intifada where the Israeli colonial authorities have transformed the West Bank into very small Bantustans where people live within an area of few kilometers square. He felt claustrophobic. This leads him to dig into political philosophy (such as Foucault, Agambin) to help him to understand everyday colonial Israeli practices in grape the Palestinian land and to makes the Palestinian territories almost unlivable place. From here he forged the concept of spacio-cide.
Hanafi argues that the Israeli colonial project is  ‘spacio-cidal’  (as opposed to genocidal) in that it targets land for the purpose of rendering inevitable the ‘voluntary’  transfer of the Palestinian population primarily by targeting the space upon which the Palestinian people live. The spacio-cide is a deliberate ideology with unified rational, albeit dynamic process because it is in constant interaction with the emerging context and the actions of the Palestinian resistance. By describing and questioning different aspects of the military-judicial-civil apparatuses, this article examines how the realization of the spacio-cidal project becomes possible through a  regime that deploys three principles, namely: the principle of colonization, the principle of separation, and the state of exception that mediates between these two seemingly contradictory principles.

Sociological Approach and Current Research 
Hanafi's approach to sociology has been greatly influenced by changes triggered by the Arab uprisings since 2011. These uprisings may have politically failed in many Arab countries, but nonetheless have succeed to produce a cognitive revolution.  Being a member of the French, Lebanese, Syrian and Palestinian Sociological Associations, as well as different regional and international associations, and having spent several years researching the production of knowledge, Hanafi believes in the internationalization of sociology so long as it is also anchored in local contexts. And at the same time, in being wary of antagonistic binary categories such as tradition/modernity, East/West, universalism/contextualism, he organized a large international conference of 55 participants under the title Sociologies in Dialogue (Fourth ISA Conference of the Council of National Associations) and co-edited a (2020). For Hanafi, several sociological concepts claim universality, such in human rights, democracy and gender equality. Yet, he sets three conditions for a concept to be a universal:  the first being that it must be the outcome of a quasi-cross-cultural consensus, and not a mere export of values embedded in the Euro-American context. Second, it is not a teleological concept, but a historical experience that gets its meaning and normativity as a result of a collective historical learning process (inherently open-ended). Third, its universality is impossible except as an imaginary; a general wide flexible concept, not a model to be exported. 
While he has found postcolonial theory useful in understanding our modernity, and especially knowledge production, his approach now is to criticize postcolonial studies as a discourse, specifically how it has been projected in the Arab region. The intersection between the social sciences and postcolonial studies has not been without its problems, and reflects a growing crisis within some sectors of the Arab left, namely those who espouse postcolonialism as a singular perspective. He highlights two features of such discourse being the excessive way anti-imperialists and anti-Western.  He suggests this postcolonial approach should be complemented by what he calls an anti-authoritarian approach.

While there are many possible paths for sociology to follow in addressing all the social, economic, political, and ecological challenges of our modernity, Hanafi sets in motion two directions for a global sociology: supplementing the postcolonial approach with an anti-authoritarian one, and theorizing post-secular society. Beyond discussing this in many keynote speeches, he published his vision in the ISA newsletter Global Dialog as a short article (2000 words) in 14 languages, and thus it was widely discussed internationally. A more in-depth version, taking into account all the comments he received, was published in Current Sociology.

Current research He currently deals mainly with two topics: first, a continuation of his work on knowledge production and knowledge used in the region, through his work with the Issam Fares Institute on “social impact of scientific research.” To this end, he launched the Portal for Social Impact of Scientific Research in/on the Arab World (Athar) in March 2018. Second, he investigates the rupture between social science and religious knowledge, and the spaces in which they coexist. His current analysis of religious discourse and curriculum in several Arab countries reveals an urgent need to work with diverse constituencies, including religious ones. Fieldworks were conducted in Morocco, Jordan and Lebanon. He will soon publish his book Addressing the rupture between the religious and social sciences: Is the morning coming soon? (Kuwait: Nohood, 2021).

Public Sociology 
Hanafi's work on public sociology has been focused on a central question: How can sociology matter beyond the structures of the academic journal? Hanafi has stated that he believes that good scientists are not always popular, and yet he is an advocate of greater involvement of academics and universities in their local societies and the acknowledgement of different regimes of knowledge. In this context, he cites Etzkowitz and Leydesdorff's concept of the Triple Helix of university-industry-government relationships but states that it has ceded its place to the Quad Helix, as there is a missing link with civil society. Civil society, for him, is playing a major role in using knowledge produced within the university and in generating knowledge-based debates in public sphere, including religious spaces, where social science has historically been unable to penetrate, and at times openly hostile. These encounters are not only salient in helping civil society, but they bring faculty research into conversation with the public. He thus advocates for this dual conversation, and a reciprocal relationship where a meaningful dialogue would take place, fostering mutual learning that not only strengthens public knowledge but also enriches research work itself and help set relevant research agendas. 
Many of his research projects, and his involvement in the IFI program ‘Policy and Governance in Palestinian Refugee Camps,’ were a sort of action-research. There, he experienced what he called “Complex entanglements: Moving from professional to public sociology in the Arab world”. Through these projects, he worked with various organizations of Palestinian and Lebanese civil societies, popular committees, and political factions to improve mainly the governance in the Palestinian refugee camps in Lebanon and the Arab East at large. Another purpose was to raise many issues about different modes of knowledge production and public sociology. The Portal for Social Impact of Scientific Research in/on the Arab World (Athar) that he founded was an instrumental tool in this regard. 
Being a Palestinian refugee, he has been active in empowering the Palestinian refugee communities. He was one of the main organizers of a March for the Palestinian Civil and Socio-economic rights in Lebanon on June 27, 2010. Around 5,000 people participated in this march coming from all refugee camps but also from Lebanese localities such as al-Shuf Mountain towards the Lebanese Parliament in Beirut. He also frequently give lectures in the Palestinian refugee camps in Lebanon, the Occupied Palestinian territories, and Syria, and participate in empowering these communities by providing them with free consultation, and attending some of their organizational meetings. Furthermore, Hanafi founded in 2005 the monthly Sociology Café, which aims at creating a forum for informal discussions between students, professors and the public on critical issues related to life in Lebanon and the region. 
Hanafi's research focused on four types of research activities (professional, critical, public and policy), however, he states that said work is challenged by the double delegitimization of social science by the authoritarian political elite and some religious authorities. To illustrate that, he carried out ethnographic research on the Palestinian refugees in Lebanon (governmentality in the refugee camps, reconstruction of Nahr el-Bared camp, civil and socio-economic rights). The outcome was not only published in international academic journals but also in Arabic and in local newspapers. This steered local debates that denounced in the same times and in varying degree the Lebanese authority and the Palestinian political factions. The research was followed by a large demonstration for the Palestinian refugee rights in different localities in Lebanon. Moreover, he participated in a Palestinian negotiation team to change the Lebanese discriminatory laws. This research also critiqued some scholars who overlook the socio-economic rights of the Palestinian refugees claiming that this would undermine the right of return. Those scholars, in the name of the political exception of the refugee camps, “theorized” keeping the camp in a misery as an urban exceptional space. Practicing public and policy sociology is indeed not an easy enterprise he started publishing exclusively in English and French as professional research before being evolved toward more complex forms of traditional and organic public sociology. Here he faced another problem how to conduct public research without losing its critical edge, even toward the deprived groups such as the Palestinian refugees, it seeks to protect. The moral of his story could be good scientists are not always popular.

Major works 
Hanafi is the author of numerous journal articles and book chapters on the political and economic sociology of the Palestinian diaspora and refugees; sociology of migration; transnationalism; politics of scientific research; civil society and elite formation and transitional justice.

Selected books 
 Bayna ‘alamayn. Rijal al-a’mal al falastiniyyin fi al-shatat wa bina al qayan al falastini (Between Two Worlds: Palestinian Businessmen in the Diaspora and the Construction of a Palestinian Entity) (1996) two editions: Cairo, Dar al-Mostaqbal al-arabi, & Ramallah: Muwatin (Palestinian Institute for the Study of Democracy), January (Arabic).
 La Syrie des ingénieurs. Perspective comparée avec l'Egypte (1997) Paris : Karthala.
 Entre Deux Mondes. Les hommes d’affaires palestiniens et la construction de l’entité palestinienne (1997) Cairo : CEDEJ.
 Business Directory of Palestinian in the Diaspora (1998) Jerusalem: Biladi (In English, French and Arabic).
 Hona wa honaq : nahwa tahlil lil ‘alaqa bin al-shatat al-falastini wa al markaz (Here and There: Towards an Analysis of the Relationship between the Palestinian Diaspora and the Center) (2001) Ramallah : Muwatin,  Jerusalem : Institute of Jerusalem Studies (distribution Beirut : Institute of Palestine Studies)
 (Ed.) Crossing borders, shifting boundaries: Palestinian Dilemmas (2008) American University in Cairo Press.
 Adi Ophir and Michal Giovanni and S. Hanafi (Ed.) The Power of Inclusive Exclusion: Anatomy of Israeli Rule in the Occupied Palestinian Territories (2009) New York: Zone Books. This book caused some troubles in AUB since he broke with it the red lines of boycotting-Israel policy adopted by the Lebanese state.
 Are Knudsen and S. Hanafi (Eds.) Palestinian Refugees: Identity, Space and Place in the Levant (2010) Routledge
 Is the morning coming soon? (Kuwait: Nohood Center)
 Knowledge Production in the Arab World: The Impossible Promise. (with R. Arvanitis) (in Arabic, Beirut:CAUS and in English, Routledge -2016)
 From Relief and Works to Human Development: UNRWA and Palestinian Refugees after 60 Years. (Edited with L Takkenberg and L Hilal) (Routledge- 2014).
 The Power of Inclusive Exclusion: Anatomy of Israeli Rule in The Occupied Palestinian Territories (Edited with A. Ophir & M. Givoni, 2009) (English and Arabic) (NY:Zone Book; Beirut:CAUS), The Emergence of A Palestinian Globalized Elite: Donors, International Organizations and Local NGOs (with L. Taber, 2005) (Arabic and English); Pouvoir et associations dans le monde arabe (Edited with S. Bennéfissa, 2002) (Paris:CNRS).

Selected journal articles

Position and membership in professional associations 
2018— (President) International Sociological Association
2017— : (Member, International Advisory Council) World Congress for Middle Eastern Studies (WOCMES)
2017— : (Member) French Sociological Association
2016— : (Founding member and vice-president) Syrian Sociological Association.
2016— : (Board member) Palestinian Sociological and Anthropological Association.
2015—2017: (Vice president) Arab Council for the Social Sciences.
2014— (Vice president) International Sociological Association (ISA)
2013— (Advisory committee member) The Arab Social Science Monitor (ASSM), ACSS
2013— (Board member) Arab Council for the Social Sciences.
2011— (Member of the International Board of Consulting Editors) International Encyclopedia of the Social and Behavioral Sciences.
2010—2014: (Member of the executive committee) International Sociological Association (ISA)
2010—2012 : (Member of Comité de suivi)  l' Institut français du Proche-Orient (IFPO)
2008—2016: (Member of the Executive Bureau) Arab Association of Sociology.
2005—: (Member) Lebanese Association of Sociology.
1994— : (Member) International Sociological Association.

References

External links 
 Sari Hanafi official website at the American University of Beirut

Academic staff of the American University of Beirut
Living people
Year of birth missing (living people)
Syrian sociologists
Damascus University alumni
University of Strasbourg alumni
School for Advanced Studies in the Social Sciences alumni
Presidents of the International Sociological Association